The 2001 Meteor Music Awards was the first edition of Ireland's national music awards. A total of twenty-five awards were presented at the ceremony.

Winners 
The list of winners list is located here.

References

External links 
 Official site
 MCD Promotions
 List of winners through the years

Meteor Awards
Meteor Awards
Meteor Music Awards